Headlam is a village in the borough of Darlington and the ceremonial county of 
County Durham, England. It lies to the west of Darlington. The population taken at the 2011 Census was less than 100. Details are included in the parish of Ingleton.  The hamlet has 14 stone houses plus 17th-century Headlam Hall, now a country house hotel. The village is set around a village green with a medieval cattle-pound and an old stone packhorse bridge across the beck. Headlam is classed as Lower Teesdale and has views to the south as far as Richmond and to the Cleveland Hills in the east.

In the Imperial Gazetteer of England and Wales (1870–72) John Marius Wilson described Headlam:

References

External links

Villages in County Durham
Places in the Borough of Darlington
Places in the Tees Valley